Maryna Linchuk (born 4 September 1987) is a Belarusian model.

Modeling career 
Linchuk was scouted at age of 16 while still at high school. In 2006 Linchuk signed with an agency in New York. Along with Mat Gordon and Valeria Garcia, Linchuk was one of the faces of Escada's Moon Sparkle fragrance under the alias Simone. She was also the Fall/Winter 2008–2010 face of the Miss Dior Cherie fragrance, directed by Sofia Coppola.

She has appeared in advertisements for Versace, Donna Karan, Dior, Gap, H&M, Kenneth Cole, Escada, Dolce & Gabbana and Max Mara. She walked in the 2008, 2009, 2010, 2011 and 2013 Victoria's Secret Fashion Shows, as well as for designers Givenchy, Gucci, Michael Kors, Prada, Christian Lacroix, Dior, Versace, Balmain, Louis Vuitton, Valentino and many others.

Linchuk has also been featured on the covers of other international Vogue such as Italian, Russian, German, Japanese, Spanish, starred in Vogue US,  Vogue Paris declared her one of the top 30 models of the 2000s.

She was cast and played a short role in Sofia Coppola's movie Somewhere, which released in 2010.

She appeared in the music video for the song "Waves" by Mr Probz.

Personal life 
Linchuk is currently engaged to her partner Brian Casey, the couple has 2 daughters.

References

External links

 
 Photos of Maryna Linchuk at Style.com

1987 births
Living people
Models from Minsk
Belarusian female models
The Lions (agency) models